Henric de la Cour born Paul Henric Dornonville de La Cour in Eskilstuna on 8 October 1974 is a Swedish songwriter, musician and singer.

Yvonne
Henric de la Cour started his musical career as the lead vocal in the Swedish group Yvonne made up of Henric de la Cour (vocals), David Lindh (guitar), Tobias Holmberg and Rikard Lindh (synthesizers), Christian Berg (bass) and Niklas Jonsson (drummer). It was founded in 1993 and folded in 2002. In a decade, the group released 4 albums and a great number of singles. For Swedish language page of group, see Yvonne (musikgrupp)

Strip Music
After break-up of Yvonne, two of its members including lead vocalist Henric de la Cour formed Strip Music in 2003 made up of Henric de la Cour (vocals), David Lindh (guitar), Christian Berg and Jens Hellqvist (synthesizers), Valdemar Asp (bass) and Richard Ankers (drums). It disbanded after releasing two albums. Strip Music traveled internationally and performed in England, The Netherlands, Norway, Denmark, Finland and Ukraine. In 2009, the group was put on hold as Henric de la Cour turned his attention to other projects. For Swedish language page of group, see Strip Music

Solo
Henric de la Cour continued his musical career. He was featured on electronica star Andreas Tilliander's album "Show". Then he lent his voice to Fireside member Per Nordmarks solo project 'Bad Hands'. He worked as a DJ and also played the part of Jack Skellington when "A Nightmare Before Christmas" was turned into a live musical.

He released his self-titled debut album Henric de la Cour, released in Scandinavia on 19 October 2011 and rest of the world on 28 October 2011.

He is appearing as the focus of a new documentary by Jacob Frössén be shown on the Swedish National Television SVT.

Discography

Albums
As part of Yvonne
1995: Yvonne
1997: Getting Out, Getting Anywhere
1999: True Love
2001: Hit That City
As part of Strip Music
2004: Strip Music
2006: Hollywood & Wolfman
Solo

Singles
As part of Yvonne
1995: "Frozen"
1995: "Wires"
1997: "Modern Love"
1997: "Protect Me"
1999: "My Man Foreverman"
1999: "Sleepless Nights"
2000: "Revelations"
2001: "Bad Dream"
2001: "Out of the Gash"
2001: "Lost in the City Nights"
As part of Strip Music
2004: "Desperation"
2004: "Never Die"
2005: "24 Hrs"
2006: "Sugar and Lime"
Solo
2011: "80s"

See also
Strip Music

References

External links
Henric de la Cour MySpace page
Strip Music website

1974 births
Living people
People from Eskilstuna
21st-century Swedish singers
21st-century Swedish male singers